Falseuncaria rjaboviana is a species of moth of the family Tortricidae. It is found in the country of Georgia.

References

Moths described in 1979
Cochylini